Predrag Radovanović (27 March 1911 – 1 August 1964) was a Serbian footballer and coach.

Nicknamed "Pegi", he was born in Belgrade, Kingdom of Serbia. He began playing in the youth team of BSK Belgrade in 1928.  In 1930 he debuted for the first team and stayed in the club until 1937 winning 4 Yugoslav championships (1931, 1933, 1935 and 1936).  Being quite tall (around 1,90m) he was a defender, full-back, known for his speed and maneuverability, with a simple and rational style of play.

He played one match for the Yugoslav national team, played in Belgrade, on April 19, 1931, against Bulgaria for the Balkan Cup, a 1:0 victory.

After finishing his playing career he became a coach and worked in Ethiopia and Australia.  He died in a car accident in Melbourne, Australia.

References

1911 births
1964 deaths
Footballers from Belgrade
Serbian footballers
Yugoslav footballers
Yugoslavia international footballers
Association football defenders
OFK Beograd players
Yugoslav First League players
Serbian football managers
Yugoslav football managers
Road incident deaths in Victoria (Australia)